Pierluigi Casiraghi (born 4 March 1969) is an Italian professional football coach and former player who played as a striker.

Casiraghi began his playing career in Italy in 1985, with Monza. He later played for Juventus, and Lazio, before ending his career with Chelsea in the Premier League. He retired after failing to recover from a cruciate ligament injury sustained in 1998. Casiraghi was a member of the Italy national football team that reached the 1994 FIFA World Cup Final, and was also a member of Italy's UEFA Euro 1996 squad.

After retiring, he began his managerial career in 2002, first with the Monza youth side, later also coaching Legnano, and the Italy U-21 side. In 2014, he worked as an assistant manager for Cagliari. Casiraghi was Gianfranco Zola's assistant manager at Birmingham City until Zola's resignation in 2017.

Club career

Italy
Casiraghi was born in Monza, Lombardy, and began his career with his hometown side, AC Monza, in 1985. The side were relegated to Serie C in his first season, but he helped them achieve promotion back to Serie B in 1988. He moved to Serie A giants Juventus in 1989, having scored 28 goals in 94 games for Monza.

His goalscoring record in Turin was modest, achieving a best tally of 8 goals in 24 appearances in the 1990–91 season and a total of 20 in 98 games for the club. While at Juventus, he helped the side win two UEFA Cups (in 1990 and 1993) and one Italian Cup, also in 1990. He scored in the first leg of the 1990 UEFA Cup Final to help the Turin club defeat rivals Fiorentina. He earned his first international cap for Italy during his spell with Juventus.

He signed for Lazio in 1993 and scored 41 goals in a five-year spell. His most successful season was in 1996–97, when he scored 14 goals in 28 Serie A games. With Lazio, he won another Italian Cup, in 1998. He found his opportunities limited in his final season, with manager Sven-Göran Eriksson preferring Alen Bokšić and Roberto Mancini in attack and sought a move away.

Chelsea
Casiraghi joined English side Chelsea in May 1998 for £5.4 million. His time in west London proved luckless, and ultimately only scored one competitive goal for the club in ten appearances, which came against Liverpool in a 1–1 draw at Anfield. His Chelsea career was cut short by a cruciate ligament injury sustained during a collision with West Ham goalkeeper Shaka Hislop in November 1998. Despite going through ten operations, he was unable to make a comeback and his contract with the club was terminated in July 2000, with Chelsea receiving an insurance payout. Casiraghi criticised the club for not helping him, and in August 2000 Casiraghi explored legal action against Chelsea for unpaid wages after his contract was terminated early.

International career
As an Italian international, Casiraghi won 7 caps, scoring 1 goal, for the Italy national under-21 football team between 1988 and 1990, and 44 caps, scoring 13 goals, for the Italy senior side between 1991 and 1998. He made his senior international debut on 13 February 1991, in a 1–0 win against Belgium, scoring his first goal for Italy in a 4–0 win over San Marino on 19 February 1992. He was a member of the Italy squad that reached the final of USA 94 under manager Arrigo Sacchi, playing in the group games against Norway and Mexico and the semi-final against Bulgaria. He was also a member of the Italy side at Euro 96, scoring both goals in a 2–1 win against Russia, but was guilty of missing a late chance against the Czech Republic that could have proved vital to the group standings, and as such the side was knocked out in the first round. Despite sealing Italy's qualification for the 1998 World Cup with the only goal in the second leg play-off against Russia to advance 2–1 on aggregate on 15 November 1997, he failed to make the squad for the final tournament under Cesare Maldini.

Style of play
Although he was primarily deployed as a centre-forward, Casiraghi was an athletic player, who was also capable of playing anywhere along the front line, due to his versatility. Throughout his career, he became renowned for his ability in the air, and for having a penchant for scoring acrobatic goals as a striker. Although he was not particularly skilful from a technical standpoint, he was a strong, hardworking, and prolific forward, with good movement off the ball, who often utilised his physical strength to hold up the ball with his back to goal in order to open up defences, and was also capable of creating space for his teammates with his attacking runs, which in turn enabled him to provide them with assists.

Managerial career
Casiraghi became manager of Italian Serie C2 side A.C. Legnano in May 2003. On 24 July 2006, he was appointed joint coach of the Italian Under-21 national team alongside former Chelsea teammate Gianfranco Zola, succeeding Claudio Gentile.

In his coaching tenure, Casiraghi led the Azzurrini into the 2007 UEFA European Under-21 Football Championship, ending in fifth place after having eliminated Spain U-21 in the qualifying phase. He was successively confirmed for the 2008 Olympic Games campaign, which ended in the quarter-finals with a 3–2 loss to Belgium. He also helped the Italian youth side to win the 2008 Toulon tournament. In the 2009 UEFA European Under-21 Football Championship, his side, having lost several key players through injury and suspension, narrowly lost 1–0 to Germany in the semi-finals.

In December 2016, he joined EFL Championship club Birmingham City, again reuniting with Gianfranco Zola, as he done at Al-Arabi in Qatar.

Career statistics

Club

1 Including 1 match in 1990 Supercoppa Italiana.
2 Including 1 match in 1998 UEFA Super Cup.

International
Source:

Honours

Club
Monza
Coppa Italia Serie C: 1987–88

Juventus
Coppa Italia: 1989–90
UEFA Cup: 1989–90, 1992–93
Supercoppa Italiana runner-up: 1990

Lazio
Coppa Italia: 1997–98

Chelsea
UEFA Super Cup: 1998

International
Italy
FIFA World Cup: 1994 (runners-up)

References

External links
FIGC Profile 

1969 births
Living people
People from Brianza
Sportspeople from Monza
Association football forwards
Italian footballers
Italy international footballers
Italy under-21 international footballers
Italian football managers
A.C. Monza players
Chelsea F.C. players
Juventus F.C. players
S.S. Lazio players
Serie A players
Serie B players
Premier League players
A.C. Legnano managers
1994 FIFA World Cup players
UEFA Euro 1996 players
Italian expatriate footballers
Expatriate footballers in England
Italian expatriate sportspeople in England
Birmingham City F.C. non-playing staff
UEFA Cup winning players
Footballers from Lombardy